Aegospotami (Aigos Potamoi) or Aegospotamos (i.e. Goat Streams) is the ancient Greek name for a small river issuing into the Hellespont (Modern Turkish Çanakkale Boğazı), northeast of Sestos.

At its mouth was the scene of the decisive battle in 405 BC in which Lysander destroyed the Athenian fleet, ending the Peloponnesian War. The ancient Greek township of the same name, whose existence is attested by coins of the 5th and 4th centuries, and the river itself were located in ancient Thrace in the Chersonese.

According to ancient sources including Pliny the Elder and Aristotle, in 467 BC a large meteorite landed near Aegospotami. It was described as brown in colour and the size of a wagon load. A comet, tentatively identified as Halley's Comet, was reported at the time the meteorite landed. This is possibly the first European record of Halley's comet.

Aegospotami is located on the Dardanelles, northeast of the modern Turkish town of Sütlüce, Gelibolu.

References

Greek colonies in the Thracian Chersonese
Ancient Greek archaeological sites in Turkey
Rivers of Turkey
Former populated places in Turkey
Landforms of Çanakkale Province
History of Çanakkale Province
 (+)
Populated places in ancient Thrace